Vladyslav Ohirya (born 3 April 1990) is a Ukrainian professional footballer who plays as a midfielder for Polissya Zhytomyr.

Career
He is a product of the LVUFK Luhansk youth academy. He later signed with Ukrainian Premier League side FC Zorya Luhansk and went on loan to Arsenal Bila Tserkva and Olimpik Donetsk in the Ukrainian First League. He made his FC Zorya debut as a substitute against FC Karpaty Lviv on 8 August 2009.

Desna Chernihiv 
In 2017, he moved to Desna Chernihiv. Two seasons later, he helped the club qualify for the 2020–21 Europa League third qualifying round.

In 2020 he became the captain of the club. He extended his contract with Desna Chernihiv for two more years following the 2020–21 season. On 24 June 2021, he left the club after four seasons.

Polissya Zhytomyr
On 26 June 2021 he signed for Polissya Zhytomyr in the Ukrainian First League. He was appointed captain for the 2022–23 season.

Honours
Desna Chernihiv
 Ukrainian First League: 2017–18

Olimpik Donetsk
 Ukrainian First League: 2013–14

Gallery

References

External links
Profile on Official website of Polissya Zhytomyr
Profile from Official Site of FC Desna

1990 births
Living people
Ukrainian footballers
People from Hirske
Association football midfielders
FC Arsenal-Kyivshchyna Bila Tserkva players
FC Zorya Luhansk players
FC Olimpik Donetsk players
Ukrainian Premier League players
Ukrainian First League players
FC Oleksandriya players
FC Irtysh Pavlodar players
FC Desna Chernihiv players
FC Desna Chernihiv captains
FC Polissya Zhytomyr players
Ukrainian expatriate footballers
Expatriate footballers in Kazakhstan
Ukrainian expatriate sportspeople in Kazakhstan
Ukraine youth international footballers
Sportspeople from Luhansk Oblast